An optical instrument (or "optic" for short) is a device that processes light waves (or photons), either to enhance an image for viewing or to analyze and determine their characteristic properties. Common examples include periscopes, microscopes, telescopes, and cameras.

Image enhancement

The first optical instruments were telescopes used for magnification of distant images, and microscopes used for magnifying very tiny images. Since the days of Galileo and Van Leeuwenhoek, these instruments have been greatly improved and extended into other portions of the electromagnetic spectrum. The binocular device is a generally compact instrument for both eyes designed for mobile use. A camera could be considered a type of optical instrument, with the pinhole camera and camera obscura being very simple examples of such devices.

Analysis
Another class of optical instrument is used to analyze the properties of light or optical materials. They include:

Interferometer for measuring the interference properties of light waves
Photometer for measuring light intensity
Polarimeter for measuring dispersion or rotation of polarized light
Reflectometer for measuring the reflectivity of a surface or object
Refractometer for measuring refractive index of various materials
Spectrometer or monochromator for generating or measuring a portion of the optical spectrum, for the purpose of chemical or material analysis
Autocollimator which is used to measure angular deflections
 Vertometer which is used to determine refractive power of lenses such as glasses, contact lenses and magnifier lens

DNA sequencers can be considered optical instruments, as they analyse the color and intensity of the light emitted by a fluorochrome attached to a specific nucleotide of a DNA strand.

Surface plasmon resonance-based instruments use refractometry to measure and analyze biomolecular interactions.

Other types 

 Polarization controller
 Magic lantern

See also
 Scientific instruments

References

External links

Instruments